The Faculty of Science is one of six faculties at the University of Waterloo. Established in 1959, the Faculty has grown and is now an internationally recognized research leader. The Faculty also values and focuses on experiential learning for students through its co-op and laboratory-focused programming. In the community, Science Outreach contributes to engaging youth and the general public with the goal of increasing awareness of the importance and value of science.

History

In the fall of 1959, the first students were enrolled in the Faculty of Science. As of 2015, there are 5,021 full-time undergraduates and 547 full-time graduate students.

In 2004/05, Science attracted almost $42.5 million in research funding in areas such as aquatic ecology, microbiology, solid state chemistry, environmental biology and groundwater contamination clean-up. In 2013/14 brought in $65 million in research funds, accounting for 38% of the University's total research income.

In October 2002, the Institute for Quantum Computing was established, with the assistance of Mike Lazaridis, as well the Perimeter Institute for Theoretical Physics.

The current Dean of the faculty is Dr. Bob Lemieux, who began his appointment July 1, 2015. He is the 9th Dean of Science at the University of Waterloo.

Others who have held the title of Dean of Science include:
 Dr. Terry McMahon, who was established in 2007.

Departments

There are currently four departments in the Faculty of Science. They are the Departments of Biology, Chemistry, Earth & Environmental Sciences, and Physics & Astronomy. The Faculty of Science also runs the School of Optometry, and the School of Pharmacy. The School of Optometry is Canada's only English-language School of Optometry, renowned for its outreach programs and vision research. The Internationally renowned Perimeter Institute for Theoretical Physics is associated with the Department of Physics, and the Institute for Quantum Computing is also run through the Faculty of Science.

Student life

Students in the Faculty of Science are represented by the Science Society (SciSoc) which hosts social events, represents student interests to the university, and operates the Science C&D student coffee shop in the Biology 1 building.

Answerable to SciSoc are the departmental clubs, which host social events for students in a particular program. These clubs include the Biochem Student Association, Biology Undergraduate Student Society, Chemistry Club, Materials & Nanosciences Society, Physics Undergraduate Society, Science and Business Students' Association, and WATROX. Due to the wide range of departments in the faculty, the clubs are based out of the many different buildings that are part of the Faculty of Science.

Additionally, all students pay into the Waterloo Science Endowment Fund (WatSEF) which provides funding for updating lab equipment and ensuring students have access to latest technologies.

The mascot for the faculty of Science is Arriba the Amoeba. Arriba is typically referred to as "she" in the third person, despite the fact actual amoebas are not gendered. Arriba is both the mascot for the faculty itself and the student-run Science Society (Unlike the Faculty of Math and the Math Society, which have separate mascots).

References

External links
Faculty of Science website
Science Society website

Faculty of Science
1959 establishments in Ontario